A laugh track (or laughter track) is a separate soundtrack for a recorded comedy show containing the sound of audience laughter. In some productions, the laughter is a live audience response instead; in the United States, where it is most commonly used, the term usually implies artificial laughter (canned laughter or fake laughter) made to be inserted into the show. This was invented by American sound engineer Charles "Charley" Douglass.

The Douglass laugh track became a standard in mainstream television in the U.S., dominating most prime-time sitcoms and sketch comedies from the late 1950s to the late 1970s. Use of the Douglass laughter decreased by the 1980s upon the development of stereophonic laughter. In addition, single-camera sitcoms eliminated audiences altogether. Canned laughter is used to encourage the viewer to laugh.

History in the United States

Radio
Before radio and television, audiences experienced live comedy performances in the presence of other audience members. Radio and early television producers used recordings of live shows and later studio-only shows attempted to recreate this atmosphere by introducing the sound of laughter or other crowd reactions into the soundtrack.

Jack Dadswell, former owner of WWJB in Florida, created the first "laughing record".

In 1946, Jack Mullin brought a Magnetophon magnetic tape recorder back from Radio Frankfurt, along with 50 reels of tape; the recorder was one of the magnetic tape recorders that BASF and AEG had built in Germany starting in 1935. The 6.5 mm tape could record 20 minutes per reel of high-quality analog audio sound; Alexander M. Poniatoff then ordered his Ampex company to manufacture an improved version of the Magnetophon for use in radio production. Bing Crosby eventually adopted the technology to pre-record his radio show, which was scheduled for a certain time every week, to avoid having to perform the show live, as well as having to perform it a second time for West Coast audiences.

With the introduction of this recording method, it became possible to add sounds during post-production. Longtime engineer and recording pioneer Jack Mullin explained how the laugh track was invented on Crosby's show:

Early live U.S. television, film; "sweetening"
In early television, most shows that were not broadcast live used the single-camera filmmaking technique, where a show was created by filming each scene several times from different camera angles. Whereas the performances of the actors and crew could be controlled, live audiences could not be relied upon to laugh at the "correct" moments; other times, audiences were deemed to have laughed too loudly or for too long.

CBS sound engineer Charley Douglass noticed these inconsistencies, and took it upon himself to remedy the situation. If a joke did not get the desired chuckle, Douglass inserted additional laughter; if the live audience chuckled too long, Douglass gradually muted the guffaws. This editing technique became known as sweetening, in which recorded laughter is used to augment the response of the real studio audience if they did not react as strongly as desired. Conversely, the process could be used to "desweeten" audience reactions, toning down unwanted loud laughter or removing inappropriate applause, thus making the laughter more in line with the producer's preferred method of telling the story.

While still working for CBS, Douglass built a prototype laugh machine that consisted of a large, wooden wheel 28 inches in diameter with a reel of tape glued to the outer edge of it containing recordings of mild laughs. The machine was operated by a key that played until it hit another detent on the wheel, thus playing a complete laugh. Because it was constructed on company time, CBS demanded possession of the machine when Douglass decided to terminate his time with them. The prototype machine fell apart within months of use. Douglass developed an expansion of his technique in 1953 when he began to extract laughter and applause from live soundtracks recorded (mainly from the pantomime segments of The Red Skelton Show), and then placed the recorded sounds into a huge tape machine.

These recorded laughs could be added to single-camera filmed programs. The first American television show to incorporate a laugh track was the sitcom The Hank McCune Show in 1950. Other single-camera filmed shows, like The Pride of the Family (ABC, 1953–54), soon followed suit, though several, like The Trouble with Father (ABC, 1950–55), The Beulah Show (ABC, 1950–52) and The Goldbergs (several networks, 1949–56), did not feature an audience or a laugh-track. Four Star Playhouse, an anthology series, did not utilize a laugh-track or audience on its occasional comedy episodes, with co-producer David Niven calling the laugh track "wild indiscriminate mirth" and stating that "I shall blackball the notion if it ever comes up. Not that it will. We shall carry on without mechanical tricks".

Multi-camera shows
Soon after the rise of the laugh track, Lucille Ball and Desi Arnaz devised a method of filming with a live audience using a setup of multiple film cameras. This process was originally employed for their sitcom I Love Lucy, which used a live studio audience and no laugh track. Multi-camera shows with live audiences sometimes used recorded laughs to supplement responses. Sketch comedy and variety shows eventually migrated from live broadcasting to videotape, which allowed for editing before a show was aired. Physically editing a taped audience show (then using quadruplex videotape) before electronic dubbing arrived caused bumps and gaps on the soundtrack; Douglass was then called upon to bridge these gaps.

Both performers and producers gradually began to realize the power behind prerecorded laughter. While witnessing an early post-production editing session, comedian Milton Berle once pointed out a particular joke and said, "as long as we're here doing this, that joke didn't get the response we wanted". After Douglass inserted a hearty laugh following the failed joke, Berle reportedly commented, "See? I told you it was funny". The comedian Bob Hope, while working on one of his television specials, took Douglass's hands in his own and began rubbing them to create the effect of limbering up Douglass's fingers, saying "OK, now, give me some good laughs."

1960s
As the medium evolved, production costs associated with broadcasting live television escalated. Filming in a studio with an audience, as I Love Lucy or The Ed Sullivan Show did, had its limitations as well: half the audience could not see the show from where they were sitting. Douglass was brought in to simulate reactions from scratch for the duration of the entire show. Producers soon realized how much simpler it was to film a show without an audience present and tailor the reactions during post-production. Directors initially did not allow space for inserting reactions, making sweetening difficult and resulted in dialogue being drowned out. Audience response cards repeatedly came back saying that laughter seemed forced or contrived. Writers gradually became more conscious of the space required for the laugh track and began timing their scripts around it. Directors gradually left room for as-yet-unheard audience reactions; producers budgeted for post-production so Douglass could edit with greater ease.

Most television sitcoms produced during the 1950s and 1960s used the single-camera technique, with a laugh track simulating the absent audience. Producers became disenchanted with the multi-camera format; consensus at the time was that live audiences were tense, nervous and rarely laughed on cue.

Hogan's Heroes

Network research suggested that the laugh track was mandatory in order to brand a single-camera show as a comedy. The experiment to see if a comedy fared better with a laugh track was tested in 1965 when CBS showed its new single-camera sitcom Hogan's Heroes to test audiences in two versions: one with the laugh track, the other without. Partly due to the somewhat cerebral nature of the show's humor, the version without the laugh track failed while the version with laughter succeeded. The show was broadcast with the laugh track, and CBS used a laugh track for all
comedies afterwards.

Sitcom laugh tracks differed, depending on the style of the show. The more outlandish the show, the more invasive the laugh track. Shows like Bewitched, The Munsters, I Dream of Jeannie and The Beverly Hillbillies relied heavily on laugh tracks, while more subdued programs, like The Andy Griffith Show, The Brady Bunch and My Three Sons, had more modulated laughter. Certain shows, like Get Smart, featured a laugh track that became more invasive as the series progressed, while shows like M*A*S*H toned down the laughter as the series became more dramatic. It was entirely absent during operating room scenes).

By the mid-1960s, nearly every U.S. sitcom was shot using the single camera and was fitted with a laughter track. Only a handful of programs, such as The Joey Bishop Show, The Dick Van Dyke Show and The Lucy Show used studio audiences but augmented the real laughter via "sweetening."

Charley Douglass and the mysterious "laff box"
From the late 1950s to the early 1970s, Charley Douglass had a monopoly on the expensive and painstaking laugh business. By 1960, nearly every prime time show in the U.S. was sweetened by Douglass. When it came time to "lay in the laughs", the producer directed Douglass where and when to insert the type of laugh requested. Inevitably, disagreements arose between Douglass and the producer, but the producer had final say. After taking his directive, Douglass went to work at creating the audience, out of sight from the producer or anyone else present at the studio.

Critic Dick Hobson commented in a July 1966 TV Guide article that the Douglass family were "the only laugh game in town." Very few in the industry ever witnessed Douglass using his invention, as he was notoriously secretive about his work, and was one of the most talked-about men in the television industry.

Douglass formed Northridge Electronics in August 1960, named after the Los Angeles suburb in the San Fernando Valley where the Douglass family resided and operated their business in a padlocked garage. When their services were needed, they wheeled the device into the editing room, plugged it in, and went to work. Production studios became accustomed to seeing Douglass shuttling from studio to studio to mix in his manufactured laughs during post-production.

The sophisticated one-of-a-kind device – affectionately known in the industry as the "laff box" – was tightly secured with padlocks, stood more than two feet tall, and operated like an organ. Only immediate members of the family knew what the inside actually looked like (at one time, the "laff box" was called "the most sought after but well-concealed box in the world"). Since more than one member of the Douglass family was involved in the editing process, it was natural for one member to react to a joke differently from another. Charley Douglass was the most conservative of all, so producers often put in bids for Charley's son Bob, who was more liberal in his choice of laughter. Subtle textural changes could have enormous consequences for the ethical situation suggested by a laugh track.

Douglass used a keyboard to select the style, gender and age of the laugh as well as a pedal to time the length of the reaction. Inside the machine was a wide array of recorded chuckles, yocks and belly laughs; exactly 320 laughs on 32 tape loops, 10 to a loop. Each loop contained up to 10 individual audience laughs spliced end-to-end, whirling around simultaneously waiting to be cued up. Since the tapes were looped, laughs were played in the same order repeatedly. Sound engineers could watch sitcoms and knew exactly which recurrent guffaws were next, even if they were viewing an episode for the first time. Douglass frequently combined different laughs, either long or short in length. Attentive viewers could spot when he decided to mix chuckles together to give the effect of a more diverse audience. Rather than being simple recordings of a laughing audience, Douglass's laughs were carefully generated and mixed, giving some laughs detailed identities such as "the guy who gets the joke early" and "housewife giggles" and "the one who didn't get the joke but is laughing anyway" all blended and layered to create the illusion of a real audience responding to the show in question. A man's deep laugh would be switched for a new woman's laugh, or a high-pitched woman's giggle would be replaced with a man's snicker. One producer noticed a recurrent laugh of a woman whom he called "the jungle lady" because of her high-pitched shriek. After regularly complaining to Douglass, the laugh was retired from the regular lineup.

There was also a 30-second "titter" track in the loop, which consisted of individual people laughing quietly. This "titter" track was used to quiet down a laugh and was always playing in the background. When Douglass inserted a hearty laugh, he increased the volume of the titter track to smooth out the final mix. This titter track was expanded to 45 seconds in 1967, later to 60 seconds in 1970, and received overhauls in 1964, 1967, 1970 and 1976. Douglass kept recordings fresh, making minor changes every few months, believing that the viewing audience evolved over time. Douglass also had an array of audience clapping, "oohs" and "ahhhs," as well as people moving in their seats (which many producers insisted be constantly audible).

Douglass knew his material well, as he had compiled it himself. He had dozens of reactions, and he knew where to find each one. Douglass regularly slightly sped up the laughter to heighten the effect. His work was well-appreciated by many in the television industry. Over the years, Douglass added new recordings and revived old ones that had been retired and then retired the newer tracks. Laughter heard in sitcoms of the early 1960s resurfaced years later in the late 1970s. Especially starting in the 1970s, Douglass started alternating the updated laugh track with an older laugh track and even sometimes combined the two together. Up to 40 different laugh clips could be combined and layered at one time, creating the effect of a larger, louder reaction when in fact the same laughs were later heard individually. As the civil rights movement gained momentum, Douglass also started making his laugh track more diverse, including examples of laughter of people from other cultures, whose sounds were noticeably different from white Americans.

Douglass's "laff box" was purchased, unseen, at auction in 2010 when its owner failed to pay rent on the storage locker where it was housed. It was later discussed, and demonstrated in a June 2010 episode of Antiques Roadshow from San Diego, California, where its value was appraised at $10,000.

Cartoons and children's shows
The laugh track was also used on some prime time animated television series, starting with The Rocky and Bullwinkle Show (ABC, 1959–61; NBC, 1961–64), but only used it for the first four episodes of the series (see its controversy below). Hanna-Barbera followed suit and utilized a full laugh track for its prime-time shows up to 1970, including The Flintstones (ABC, 1960–66), Top Cat (ABC, 1961–62), and The Jetsons (ABC, 1962–63). Hanna-Barbera's mid-summer sitcom, Where's Huddles? (CBS, 1970), as well as Krayo Creston and MCA's Calvin and the Colonel (ABC, 1961–62), also used a laugh track. Midday programming, like The Banana Splits Adventure Hour (NBC, 1968–70), gradually followed suit. A Charlie Brown Christmas (1965) was also intended to have a laugh track, but creator Charles M. Schultz refused the inclusion of a laugh track. From 1968 to 1983, most comedic cartoons produced for the Saturday morning genre were fitted with a laugh track, beginning with Filmation's The Archie Show in 1968. Rankin-Bass, DePatie–Freleng Enterprises (DFE) and Hanna-Barbera followed suit. As Douglass' laughter became redundant in the television industry, all of the animation studios eventually abandoned the laugh track by the early 1980s. Filmation's Gilligan's Planet (CBS, 1982–83) was the final animated Saturday-morning series to include a laugh track.

Because The Banana Splits was shown midday, Scooby-Doo, Where Are You! (CBS, 1969–70) became Hanna-Barbera's first Saturday morning show to use Douglass' laugh track in 1969. Following its success, Hanna-Barbera expanded the laugh track to virtually all of its shows for the 1970–71 season, including Harlem Globetrotters (CBS, 1970–71) and Josie and the Pussycats (CBS, 1970–71).

The Pink Panther Show (NBC, 1969–1978; ABC, 1978–1980) was an anomaly among its peers. The show consisted of previous theatrical entries compiled into a series of half-hour showcases, which included other DFE theatrical shorts including The Inspector, Roland and Ratfink, The Ant and the Aardvark and The Tijuana Toads (redubbed as The Texas Toads for television due to perceived Mexican racial stereotypes). The original theatrical versions did not contain laugh tracks, but NBC insisted on its inclusion for television broadcast. The soundtracks were restored to their original form in 1982 when the DFE theatrical package went into syndication. Repackaging over the years has resulted in both theatrical and television versions of the entries being available. The exceptions were Misterjaw and Crazylegs Crane, which were produced specifically for television and never re-released theatrically, resulting in laughter-only versions.

Following Filmation were producers Sid and Marty Krofft. When production began on H.R. Pufnstuf in 1969, executive producer Si Rose viewed any comedy without a laugh track as a handicap, and convinced the Kroffts to include one on Pufnstuf. After Pufnstuf, the Kroffts employed Douglass's services on all shows produced for Saturday morning television (except for Land of the Lost, which was more dramatic in nature), including The Bugaloos, Lidsville, Sigmund and the Sea Monsters, The Lost Saucer and Far Out Space Nuts. When transitioning from high concept children's programming to live variety shows, the Kroffts continued to employ Douglass for sweetening. Several shows included Donny and Marie, The Brady Bunch Variety Hour, The Krofft Supershow, The Krofft Superstar Hour, Pink Lady and Jeff, Barbara Mandrell and the Mandrell Sisters, Pryor's Place, as well as their 1987 syndicated sitcom D.C. Follies.

As the use of laugh tracks for Saturday morning series became more common, Douglass eventually added several children's laughs to his library. "Kiddie laughs", as they are known, first saw use for sweetening for the 1973 syndicated television special, The World of Sid and Marty Krofft at the Hollywood Bowl, but were soon heard on most Saturday morning kids' shows by 1974, such as Uncle Croc's Block, Sigmund and the Sea Monsters, The Pink Panther Show, The Lost Saucer and Far Out Space Nuts.

Current Disney Channel-produced sitcoms and studio-created laugh tracks are primarily recorded in front of live audiences. Nickelodeon – Disney's top competitor – utilizes a laugh track for shows such as iCarly and Victorious since closing the original studio facilities fitted for live audience seating.

Making their own
By 1970, Douglass's laugh business was proving so lucrative that he decided to raise the rates for his services. However, unlike sitcoms, cartoons were mainly produced with lower budgets and studios looked for opportunities to reduce costs. Hanna-Barbera and Rankin-Bass distanced themselves from Douglass starting in 1971. They still felt that having a laugh track was necessary, so they began extracting several of Douglass's chuckles by various means and compiled their own laugh tracks. These custom laugh tracks were controversial, and contemporaries and historians questioned the sensibility and realism for the use of these tracks.

Despite this trend, Filmation, DePatie-Freleng Enterprises and Sid & Marty Krofft Television Productions still retained the services of Douglass for their Saturday-morning content.

Hanna-Barbera
Hanna-Barbera was the first cartoon production studio to cease using Douglass's services. They first used the laugh track for their prime-time shows, such as The Flintstones, Top Cat, and The Jetsons. They then expanded using the laugh track into their daytime fare, starting with The Banana Splits in 1968, which emulated Filmation's The Archies. Successful series prior to 1971, like Scooby-Doo, Where Are You!, Harlem Globetrotters and Josie and the Pussycats employed a full laugh track. This changed at the start of the 1971–72 season, when Hanna-Barbera employed their limited laugh track using the MacKenzie Repeater machine, a tape machine that can play up to five sound effects repeatedly on rotation, which cued up to five Douglass laughs repeatedly. Mixed with a metallic sound, it included three mild laughs and two uncontrollable belly-laughs (one contains a woman laughing prominently at the tail end). With the exception of their variety shows, such as The Hanna-Barbera Happy Hour, which they briefly turned to Douglass for sweetening, Hanna-Barbera used these laughs regularly over the next decade on nearly all of their Saturday morning fare.

The Hanna-Barbera laugh track affected several television specials as well, many of them from The ABC Saturday Superstar Movie (ABC, 1972–74), which served as a showcase for hopeful new comedic cartoon shows. On occasion, the studio slowed the laugh track for a greater effect; this was done for the second season of The New Scooby-Doo Movies.

Hanna-Barbera also used the limited laugh track when they produced Wait Till Your Father Gets Home in 1972. This laugh track, which added an additional belly laugh to the mix, was noticeably slowed during production (Wait Till Your Father Gets Home was the only television series produced by Hanna-Barbera to have included that specific belly laugh track).

Saturday morning shows featuring the Hanna-Barbera laugh track:

 Harlem Globetrotters (CBS, 1970–71; second season only)
 Help!... It's the Hair Bear Bunch! (CBS, 1971–72)
 The Pebbles and Bamm-Bamm Show (CBS, 1971–72)
 The Funky Phantom (ABC, 1971–72)
 The Roman Holidays (NBC, 1972)
 The Amazing Chan and the Chan Clan (CBS, 1972)
 The Flintstone Comedy Hour (CBS, 1972–73)
 Josie and the Pussycats in Outer Space (CBS, 1972–74)
 The New Scooby-Doo Movies (CBS, 1972–74)
 Yogi's Gang (ABC, 1973)
 The Addams Family (CBS, 1973–74)
 Inch High, Private Eye (NBC, 1973–74)
 Jeannie (CBS, 1973–75)
 Speed Buggy (CBS, 1973–75)
 Goober and the Ghost Chasers (ABC, 1973–75)
 Hong Kong Phooey (ABC, 1974)
 Partridge Family 2200 A.D. (CBS, 1974–75)
 Wheelie and the Chopper Bunch (NBC, 1974)
 The Great Grape Ape Show (ABC, 1975–78)
 Jabberjaw (ABC, 1976–78)
 The Scooby-Doo Show (ABC, 1976–78)
 Dynomutt, Dog Wonder (ABC, 1976–77)
 Captain Caveman and the Teen Angels (ABC, 1977–80)
 The Super Globetrotters (NBC, 1979–80)
 Scooby-Doo and Scrappy-Doo (ABC, 1979–80; first installment)
 Fred and Barney Meet the Shmoo (NBC, 1979–80)
 Fred and Barney Meet the Thing (NBC, 1979)
 The New Fred and Barney Show (NBC, 1979)
 Casper and the Angels (NBC, 1979)

Prime time specials/TV movies:

 Wait Till Your Father Gets Home (Syndicated, 1972–74)
 The Banana Splits in Hocus Pocus Park (ABC, 1972)
 A Flintstone Christmas (NBC, 1977)
 The Flintstones: Little Big League (NBC, 1978)
 The Flintstones Meet Rockula and Frankenstone (NBC, 1979)
 Scooby-Doo Goes Hollywood (ABC, 1979)
 Casper the Friendly Ghost: He Ain't Scary, He's Our Brother (NBC, 1979)
 Casper's First Christmas (NBC, 1979)
 The Flintstone Primetime Specials:
 The Flintstones' New Neighbors (NBC, 1980)
 The Flintstones: Fred's Final Fling (NBC, 1980)
 The Flintstones: Wind-Up Wilma (NBC, 1981)
 The Flintstones: Jogging Fever (NBC, 1981)

The Hanna-Barbera laugh track was discontinued after the 1981–82 television season.

In 1994, laugh track historian and re-recording mixer Paul Iverson commented on the legacy of the Hanna-Barbera track:
 Iverson added:

Rankin/Bass
Animation studio Rankin/Bass, best remembered for their Christmas specials, also experimented with fitting their Saturday morning animated series The Jackson 5ive with a laugh track in 1971. Like Hanna-Barbera, Rankin/Bass isolated several snippets of canned chuckles from Douglass's library and inserted them onto the soundtrack. The laughs initially consisted of only loud eruptions; mild jokes received unnatural bouts of laughter, while other times, the laughter erupted in mid-sentence. The studio had improved the process by the time production began on The Osmonds in 1972, using more modulated laughs culled from Douglass's 1971–1972 library. Laughs did not erupt mid-sentence like The Jackson 5ive and timing was improved by Rankin/Bass sound engineers. Unlike Hanna-Barbera's laugh track, Rankin/Bass provided a larger variety of laughs and did not sound as metallic.

The studio ended the practice when production on the two series ended.

Jim Henson & Associates: The Muppet Show
Unlike the two "silent" pilots before it, The Muppet Show series incorporated its own laugh track onto the show, but in a completely different manner; because the variety program was modeled after vaudeville, the viewers were often treated to glimpses of the theater audience and their reactions to The Muppets' antics on stage (though the audience was composed of Muppet characters as well).

As the show was produced at the ATV Elstree Studios in England, Jim Henson and his Muppet production team bypassed Douglass's familiar laughs. New laughs, chuckles and applause were recorded for the first few episodes so they sounded fresh and new. Some of these laughs were provided by the actual cast and crew members reacting to dailies of episodes; eventually, The Muppet Show began recycling these same chuckles for later shows, establishing its own one-of-a-kind laugh track. A by-product of this convincing laugh track was the belief by viewers that The Muppet Show was indeed taped in front of a live audience, some even asking for tickets to attend tapings; Henson's son, Brian, noted how strange he thought it was that people believed the show was shot before a live audience. Henson himself knew that having a live audience was impractical, given the production complexities (the NBC sitcom ALF was also difficult to produce and utilized only a laugh track); he also notes that because of the series' vaudeville inspiration, having sounds of laughter was a necessity, but admits that it was not an easy task – "I look at some of the early shows, I'm really embarrassed by them. The sweetening got better later on, but it's always a difficult thing to do well, and to create the reality of the audience laughing." Henson himself initially felt apprehensive about adding a laugh track to a Muppet series, and later commented about the pilot episode not having a laugh track, saying "I did one special dry – without any laugh track – looked at it, and then tried it adding a laugh track to it, and it's unfortunate, but it makes the show funnier."

Various Muppet characters or guest stars broke the fourth wall and acknowledged the use of the laugh track. In the fourth episode of the series, Kermit the Frog was asked by guest Ruth Buzzi if he felt a gag or routine was funny enough for the show, to which he turned to the camera and replied, "That's up to the laugh track." A season two episode featuring guest Steve Martin eschewed a laugh track altogether to support the concept that the show had been canceled that night in favor of auditioning new acts; the only audible laughs were those of the Muppet performers themselves.

After The Muppet Show ended in 1981, most Muppet projects were produced in the U.S. due to the demise of the commercial ATV franchise in the UK and Lord Lew Grade, who had financed the show, no longer being involved in television. Post-Muppet Show fare then turned to Douglass for audience reactions; one-shot specials such as The Fantastic Miss Piggy Show and The Muppets: A Celebration of 30 Years were given full audience by Douglass's son, Robert, who by that time was running Northridge Electronics following his father's retirement. Robert Douglass also orchestrated the audience for Disney's unsuccessful Muppet Show reboot, Muppets Tonight.

1970s; Comeback of live audiences
Though the use of canned laughter reached its peak in the 1960s, a few shows still retained the multi-camera tradition. In 1967, Desi Arnaz produced The Mothers-in-Law (NBC, 1967–69), which was recorded in front of a live audience at Desilu Studios, with a sweetening performed in post-production. A year later, The Good Guys (CBS, 1968–70) followed the same format. Production changes in location, however, caused the remainder of the first season to transition back to single-camera entirely, using only a laugh track. This continued through season two until low ratings led to its cancellation in 1970.

The 1970s began with the decline of rural-based shows (such as The Beverly Hillbillies, Green Acres and Mayberry RFD) and the rise of socially conscious programming (such as All in the Family, M*A*S*H and Maude). The resulting change also spurred the return of live audiences, starting with Here's Lucy (CBS, 1968–1974), which starred Lucille Ball and served as a prototypal impetus to the new subject matter, and ultimately The Mary Tyler Moore Show (CBS, 1970–77). The series' pilot episode, "Love is All Around", had been initially filmed using the single-camera method. The results were not satisfactory to Moore or the producers, who then decided to shift to multiple cameras. Since the first several episodes were taped in late summer, the pilot's first taping was not received well due to bad insulation and poor audio. The second taping, however, provided better air conditioning and a better quality sound system to the stage. Critical reception thus improved, and the show used the multi-camera format thereafter, and became a major success during its seven-year run.

The resurgence of live audiences began to gradually take hold. More sitcoms began to veer away from the single-camera, movie-style format, reverting to the multi-camera format with a live studio audience providing real laughter, which producers found more pleasing because it had a better comic rhythm and helped them write better jokes. Creator Norman Lear's All in the Family (CBS, 1971–1979) followed suit in 1971. Videotaped live, Lear was more spontaneous; he wanted the studio audience to act like the performer, with hopes of the two developing a rapport with each other. Lear was not a fan of pretaped audiences, resulting in no laugh track being employed, not even during post-production when Lear could have had the luxury of sweetening any failed jokes (Lear relented somewhat in later seasons, and allowed Douglass to insert an occasional laugh). Lear's decision resulted in the show being a huge success, and ushered in the return of live audiences to the U.S. sitcom mainstream. To make his point clear, an announcement proclaimed over the closing credits each week that "All in the Family was recorded on tape before a live audience" or during the show's final seasons where live audiences no longer attended tapings of the show, "All in the Family was played to a studio audience for live responses."

Jack Klugman and Tony Randall expressed displeasure during the first season of The Odd Couple (ABC, 1970–75), which used a laugh track without a live audience. Co-creator/executive producer Garry Marshall also disliked utilizing a laugh track, and theatre veteran Randall, in particular, resented the process of having to wait several seconds between punchlines in order to allot enough space for the laugh track to be inserted. The production team experimented with omitting the laugh track altogether with the episode "Oscar's New Life"; the episode aired without a laugh track (laughter was subsequently added for syndication in order to maintain continuity). ABC relented by the second season, with The Odd Couple being filmed with three cameras (vs. a single camera the previous season) and performed like a stage play in front of a studio audience. The change also required a new, larger set to be constructed within a theatre. With a live audience present, Randall and Klugman enjoyed the spontaneity that came with it; any missed or blown lines went by without stopping (they could always be re-filmed during post-production). In addition, it gave the show a certain edge that was seen  as missing in the first season, although actors had to deliver lines louder, since they were on a larger sound stage as opposed to a quiet studio with only minimal crew present. Klugman later commented, "We spent three days rehearsing the show. We sat around a table the first day. We tore the script apart. We took out all the jokes and put in character. The only reason we leave in any jokes is for the rotten canned laughter. I hated it. I watch the shows at home, I see Oscar come in and he says, 'Hi,' and there is the laughter. 'Hey,' I think, 'what the hell did I do?' I hate it; it insults the audience."

The sitcom Happy Days (ABC, 1974–84) mirrored The Odd Couple scenario as well. Its first two seasons used only a laugh track, and by third season, shifted over to a live audience.

The shows were not entirely live, however. With the exception of All in the Family, sweetening was still a necessity during post-production in order to bridge any gaps in audience reactions. Television/laugh track historian Ben Glenn II observed a taping of the sitcom Alice (CBS, 1976–85) and noted the need for sweetening: "The actors kept blowing their lines. Of course, by the third or fourth take, the joke was no longer funny. A Douglass laugh was inserted into the final broadcast version to compensate."

Some producers, like James Komack, however, followed Lear's approach. Komack, who was involved in the short-lived sitcom Hennesey starring Jackie Cooper, was a longtime critic of the Douglass laugh track, believing the laughs were too predictable and could hinder the effect of the sitcom's humor. Komack instead employed music to counteract the sweetened laughs. He experimented with this technique in The Courtship of Eddie's Father (ABC, 1969–72), which featured a subdued laugh track. Multi-camera shows produced by Komack, such as Chico and the Man (NBC, 1974–78) and Welcome Back, Kotter (ABC, 1975–79), utilized background music cues during scene transitions (obvious locations for sweetening) and made sure that Douglass's laugh track was used infrequently during post-production. Komack later commented, "If you ever try to do a show without a laugh track, you'll see a huge difference...[I]t flattens. The only way to get away from a laugh track is to use music, which can indicate when something is funny." On sweetening, he continued, "Then it's determined by the taste of the producers – by the morality of the producers...[A]fter a while, you learn that it is valueless. In the extremes, people are going to hear it and say, 'Why are they laughing?' and they'll turn off your program."

In addition to The Odd Couple, The Mary Tyler Moore Show and Happy Days, other live sitcoms that were sweetened by Douglass (many of which also sweetened by Pratt by the end of the 1970s) were The Paul Lynde Show (ABC, 1972–73), The Bob Newhart Show (CBS, 1972–78), Maude (CBS, 1972–78), Rhoda (CBS, 1974–78), Barney Miller (ABC, 1975–82), Laverne and Shirley (ABC, 1976–83), Soap (ABC, 1977–81), The Comedy Shop (Syndication, 1978–81), Mork & Mindy (ABC, 1978–82), Taxi (ABC, 1978–82; NBC, 1982–83), Cheers (NBC, 1982–93) and its spinoff Frasier (NBC, 1993–2004).

Variety shows that became prominent during the 1970s, such as The Carol Burnett Show, The Flip Wilson Show and The Dean Martin Show (as well as The Dean Martin Celebrity Roast succeeding afterwards) also continued to use Douglass's sweetening for any less appealing jokes performed during sketches.

Game shows were sweetened during the 1970s and early 1980s, often played when a contestant or the host says something considered to be funny and only a small reaction comes from the live audience. Douglass's laugh track was especially heard in Chuck Barris' game shows (i.e. The Gong Show and The Newlywed Game), whose shows were designed mainly to entertain the audience; the "prizes" were often rudimentary or derisive. Game shows that were produced at CBS Television City and NBC Studios Burbank were also sweetened, often to intensify audience reactions, including shows like Press Your Luck (used during "Whammy" segments). During a typical game show's closing credits, the show used canned cheers and applause noises to sweeten the live studio audience applause noises that viewers did not hear during the credits. This was common on daytime game shows on CBS and NBC and some syndicated game shows from the 1970s through the 1990s. Game shows taped at NBC Studios Burbank used three different applause tracks for sweetening: one with a smaller crowd, one with a medium crowd, and one with a large crowd with a cheerful male audience member in the background. However, many kids' game shows, most ABC game shows, and most Mark Goodson-Bill Todman productions, such as The Price Is Right, Match Game and Family Feud were taped with a live audience present, though sweetening was used on rare occasions.

There were still some producers who either still did not trust a live audience, produced a show that was too complex for an audience to be present, favored the single-camera method, or could not afford to screen it live to an audience for responses. In these cases, Douglass orchestrated the laugh track from scratch. Sitcoms like The Brady Bunch, The Partridge Family and M*A*S*H utilized the single-camera method for their entire run. Several hour-long comedy dramas, like The Love Boat and Eight Is Enough, used only a laugh track.

In the intervening years beginning with live film, progressing through videotape and onto studio-filmed productions with no live audience back to live-on-tape, Douglass had gone from merely enhancing or tweaking a soundtrack, to literally customizing entire audience reactions to each performance and back again to enhancing and tweaking performances recorded with live audiences.

Competition and decline
Although Douglass had a monopoly on the laugh track, he eventually faced competition by 1977 when other sound engineers began to offer laugh tracks that differed from Douglass's distinctive laughs. Most notably, engineer and Douglass protégé Carroll Pratt started his own company, Sound One. Pratt and his brother had been working under Douglass since the early 1960s, but began to notice that Douglass's technique was falling behind as advances were made in production technology. Pratt commented that after years of constant use, an audible hiss could be heard when a laugh was being cued up due to Douglass's tapes wearing out. Pratt also observed that as the 1970s progressed, audiences started maturing more with the sitcom's humor, that he felt Douglass should also tone down his invasive laughs while adding quieter and more subdued laughter to the mix. While not stubborn, Douglass was so fond of his machine and technique that he felt no urgency to advance his technology. Pratt parted ways with Douglass after the 1976–77 television season wrapped up, and created a new "laff box," one that was simpler to use and had greater capacity than Douglass's (Pratt's recordings were on cassette tape, Douglass's on an older reel-to-reel tape). With the advent of stereo television, Pratt's stereo recordings matched the sound quality of television shows being filmed or videotaped in that audio format, whereas Douglass attempted to convert previous mono analog recordings to stereo. Pratt introduced an innovative laugh track that contained more realistic (though less distinctive) reactions. While Pratt's laugh track had its share of recognizable chuckles as well, they are more quiet and subtle than Douglass's, which had become so familiar and ubiquitous that they sounded trite. Some sitcoms started switching to Pratt's laugh track in 1977, including M*A*S*H and The Love Boat (which were more dramatic in tone). By the end of the decade, many live and single-camera sitcoms, such as Laverne and Shirley, Happy Days, Eight Is Enough, and all post-1978 MTM productions like WKRP in Cincinnati (CBS, 1978–82) and Newhart (CBS, 1982–90), also chose Pratt over Douglass for the sweetening process.

The competition from Pratt caused Douglass to retool his library after the 1977–78 television season, retiring most of his distinctive laughs with new laughs and salvaging his more extreme reactions almost exclusively. The combination of classic loud guffaws, mixed with his own new, less invasive recordings, had middling results.

Both viewers and television critics had become conditioned to hearing laughter as part of the television comedy viewing experience. Shows like The Days and Nights of Molly Dodd (NBC, 1987–88), Hooperman (ABC, 1987–89) and Doogie Howser, M.D. (ABC, 1989–93) were comedy dramas that abandoned the laughter altogether, earning laudatory media attention in the process.

Single-camera comedy has made a comeback in the U.S. since the early 1990s, but networks have mostly abandoned the old tradition of laugh tracks for single-camera shows. A key player in this revolution was HBO, which allowed its single-camera comedies such as Dream On and The Larry Sanders Show to run without laugh tracks, and won critical praise for doing so. Single-camera shows without an audience, live or laugh track, have become increasingly common on broadcast networks as well.

Animated shows have also gone silent, except on the rare occasion that canned laughter is used, usually as a parody of a sitcom. Animated shows that used to employ a laugh track, such as Scooby-Doo, had dismissed the laugh track altogether by the 1990s. However, sitcoms made by It's a Laugh Productions, such as That's So Raven, use laugh tracks.

Sweetening is a common practice in live awards shows such as the Emmy Awards, the Academy Awards and the MTV Video Music Awards. The microphones onstage often do not fully pick up the audience's laughter and reaction to the monologues as audiences are not microphoned in live awards shows due to the amount of conversation that takes place during filming. Laughter and applause are often sweetened and edited prior to public viewing, or if aired live, are done on the spot via a seven-second delay (the same crew is also used to mute swear words and controversial statements from award winners).

Holliston, an independently produced multicamera sitcom on the defunct Fearnet, used laugh tracks to mimic the look and feel of popular sitcoms from the 1980s and 1990s. Creator Adam Green also expressed interest in using a live studio audience in the future.

Controversy, bucking the trend
The practice of simulating an audience reaction was controversial from the beginning. A silent minority of producers despised the idea of a prerecorded audience reaction. Douglass was aware that his "laff box" was maligned by critics and actors, but also knew that the use of a laugh track became standard practice. Leading industry experts reasoned that laugh tracks were a necessary evil in prime time television: without the canned laughter, a show was doomed to fail. It was believed that in the absence of any sort of audience reaction, American viewers could not differentiate between a comedy or drama. That did not stop several from forgoing the laugh track entirely:
 Former child star Jackie Cooper believed that the laugh track was false. Cooper's comedy/drama Hennesey (CBS, 1959–62) was cancelled in 1962 after three seasons. For its first two seasons, the show used only a mild laugh track; by the third and final season, the chuckles were eliminated completely. Cooper later commented that "we're manufacturing a reaction to our own creation, yet we'll never know if people out there are really laughing." Cooper concluded by saying, "It's a put-on all the time."
 In September 1964, the comedy/drama Kentucky Jones (NBC, 1964–65), starring Dennis Weaver, tried to eliminate laughs, simulated or live. After only five episodes and slumping ratings, Douglass was recruited to add the laugh track. Kentucky Jones was cancelled the following April.
 Ross Bagdasarian Sr., creator of the Alvin and the Chipmunks franchise, outright refused to utilize a laugh track when production began on The Alvin Show (CBS, 1961–62) in 1961. Bagdasarian's reasoning was if the show was funny, the viewers would laugh without being prompted. The Alvin Show was cancelled after a single season.
 Peanuts creator Charles M. Schulz refused to employ a laugh track during the production of the holiday favorite A Charlie Brown Christmas (CBS, 1965). Like Bagdasarian, Schulz maintained that the audience should be able to enjoy the show at their own pace, without being cued when to laugh. When CBS executives saw the final product, they were horrified and believed the special would be a flop (CBS did create a version of the show with the laugh track added, just in case Schulz changed his mind; this version remains unavailable). When the special first aired on December 9, 1965, it was a surprise critical and commercial hit. As a result of this success, all subsequent Peanuts specials aired with no laugh track present.
 Rocky and His Friends (ABC, 1959–61; NBC, 1961–64 as The Bullwinkle Show) was originally broadcast with a laugh track, against the wishes of creators Jay Ward and Bill Scott, who disputed the laugh track with ABC; given the rapid-fire pace of the show's humor, the laugh track slowed the timing and at times interrupted dialogue. After getting support from sponsor General Mills, Ward and Scott convinced ABC, and the laugh track ended after its fourth episode; while current syndicated prints of these episodes still retain the laugh track, it has been subsequently removed from the DVD release.
 The musical sitcom The Monkees (NBC, 1966–68) featured a laugh track throughout its first season and several episodes of the second. Midway through Season 2, the Monkees band members insisted the show eliminate the laugh track, believing their viewers were intelligent enough to know where the jokes were. NBC, already annoyed by the rock group wanting too much control over their show, cancelled The Monkees after the conclusion of its second season, citing the removal of the laugh track as a significant factor. Peter Tork commented in 2013 that "we didn't want it from the beginning, but NBC insisted. I thought it was a stroke of genius when it was eliminated in the second season."
 Bill Cosby's first sitcom, The Bill Cosby Show (NBC, 1969–71) was produced without a laugh track at the insistence of Cosby. He stated that his opposition to NBC's desire to add a laugh track led to the show's cancellation after two seasons.
 Andy Griffith initially resisted the inclusion of a laugh track on The Andy Griffith Show. Co-star Don Knotts had previously been a member of the ensemble cast of The Steve Allen Show when it transitioned from a live audience to a laugh track in its fourth season. Knotts felt the artificial audience reaction contributed to the show's demise – a sentiment that influenced Griffith's opinion. Instead of a laugh track, Griffith insisted on screening completed episodes in front of an audience, recording their reaction, and inserting that into the show's soundtrack (a practice that became more commonplace for television comedies in years to come). The earliest episodes include these custom audience reactions; however, Griffith's experiment was too costly, and the network insisted on a Douglass laugh track. Griffith eventually compromised on the grounds that it be utilized sparingly.
 Larry Gelbart, co-creator of M*A*S*H (CBS, 1972–83), initially wanted the show to air without a laugh track ("Just like the actual Korean War", he remarked dryly). Though CBS initially rejected the idea, a compromise was reached that allowed Gelbart and co-producer Gene Reynolds to omit the laugh track during operating room scenes if they wished. "We told the network that under no circumstances would we ever can laughter during an OR scene when the doctors were working," said Gelbart in 1998. "It's hard to imagine that 300 people were in there laughing at somebody's guts being sewn up." Seasons 1–5 utilized Douglass's more invasive laugh track; Carroll Pratt's quieter laugh track was employed for Seasons 6–11 when the series shifted from sitcom to comedy drama with the departure of Gelbart and Reynolds. Several episodes ("O.R.", "The Bus", ""Quo Vadis, Captain Chandler?", "The Interview", "Point of View" and "Dreams" among them) omitted the laugh track; as did almost all of Season 11, including the 135-minute series finale, "Goodbye, Farewell and Amen". The laugh track is also omitted from some international and syndicated airings of the show; on one occasion during an airing in the UK, the laugh track was accidentally left on, and viewers expressed their displeasure, an apology from the network for the "technical difficulty" was later released. The DVD releases, meanwhile, give the viewer a choice of watching every episode with or without the laugh tracks (though the French and Spanish track do not have this option). UK DVD critics speak poorly of the laugh track, stating "canned laughter is intrusive at the best of times, but with a programme like M*A*S*H, it's downright unbearable." "They're a lie," said Gelbart in a 1992 interview. "You're telling an engineer when to push a button to produce a laugh from people who don't exist. It's just so dishonest. The biggest shows when we were on the air were All in the Family and The Mary Tyler Moore Show both of which were taped before a live studio audience where laughter made sense," continued Gelbart. "But our show was a film show – supposedly shot in the middle of Korea. So the question I always asked the network was, 'Who are these laughing people? Where did they come from?'" Gelbart persuaded CBS to test the show in private screenings with and without the laugh track. The results showed no measurable difference in the audience's enjoyment. "So you know what they said?" Gelbart said. "'Since there's no difference, let's leave it alone!' The people who defend laugh tracks have no sense of humor." Gelbart summed up the situation by saying, "I always thought it cheapened the show. The network got their way. They were paying for dinner."
 The sitcom Police Squad!, which was a parody of police procedurals, did not utilize a laugh track in any of its six episodes. The decision not to incorporate one was at the behest of its creators, the trio of Zucker-Abrahams-Zucker, since most of the humor of the program was derived from events that occurred either in the foreground or in the background of various scenes.
 Another satirical police sitcom, Sledge Hammer! (ABC, 1986–88), utilized a laugh track for the first 13 episodes of its first season, which creator Alan Spencer did not approve of. After months of fighting with ABC, Spencer was able to cease adding laughter beginning with episode 14, "State of Sledge".
 The sitcom Dinosaurs (ABC, 1991–94) initially featured a laugh track. At the insistence of co-producers Brian Henson and Michael Jacobs, it was eventually dropped as the show grew in popularity.
 Sports Night (ABC, 1998–2000) premiered with a laugh track, against the wishes of show creator Aaron Sorkin, but the laugh track became more subtle as the season progressed and was completely removed at the start of the second season. In some cases, a laugh track was needed to maintain continuity, as portions of each episode were filmed in front of a live audience, while the remainder were filmed without an audience present.
 The 2020 revival of Saved by the Bell is a single-camera sitcom that dropped the live audience and laugh track altogether, which is a major difference from the original series.

Outside the U.S.

United Kingdom
In the 20th century, most sitcoms in the United Kingdom were taped before live audiences to provide natural laughter. Scenes recorded outdoors, traditionally recorded in advance of studio work, are played back to the studio audience and their laughter is recorded for the broadcast episode (occasionally, entire shows have been recorded in this fashion). Other comedies, such as The Royle Family and The Office, which are presented in the mode of cinéma vérité rather than in the format of a traditional sitcom, do not feature any audience laughter.

One notable exception to the use of a live audience was Thames Television's The Kenny Everett Video Show, whose laugh track consisted of spontaneous reaction to sketches from the studio production crew. This technique was maintained throughout its four-year run, even as the show moved to larger studio facilities and its emphasis switched from music to comedy. Everett's later series for the BBC (The Kenny Everett Television Show) were recorded in front of live studio audiences.

In the early 1980s it was BBC policy that comedy programmes be broadcast with a laugh track, though producers did not always agree this suited their programmes. As a result, a laugh track for The Hitchhiker's Guide to the Galaxy was recorded for the first episode, but dropped before transmission. The League of Gentlemen was originally broadcast with a laugh track, but this was dropped after the programme's second series.

The pilot episode of the satirical series Spitting Image was also broadcast with a laugh track, apparently at the insistence of Central Television. This idea was dropped as the show's producers felt that the show worked better without one. Some later editions, in 1992 (Election Special) and 1993 (two episodes) did use a laughter track, as these were performed live in front of a studio audience and included a spoof Question Time.

Most episodes of Only Fools and Horses feature a studio audience; the exceptions, which featured no laughter at all, were all Christmas specials, "To Hull and Back", "A Royal Flush" and the second part of "Miami Twice". For their DVD releases, "A Royal Flush" (which was edited to remove over 20 minutes of footage) had an added laughter track, as did the second part of "Miami Twice" (which was merged with the first part to make Miami Twice: The Movie).

In the 21st century, many sitcoms inspired by the new wave of British comedies of the late 1990s have not featured a laugh track or studio audience. Although Green Wing does not feature audience laughter, partly because of its surreal nature, it does feature unusual lazzi techniques, where the film of the episode is slowed down immediately following a joke. Mrs Brown's Boys and Still Open All Hours both feature a studio audience.

Canada
Most contemporary Canadian television comedies do not incorporate a laugh track, although some programs, such as the sitcom Maniac Mansion (1990–1993) and the children's program The Hilarious House of Frightenstein (1971) had a laugh track added for airings in the U.S. despite being broadcast in Canada without one.

The children's sketch comedy series You Can't Do That on Television (1979–1990) had no laugh track during its first season as a locally televised program. However, when it entered the Canadian network realm (as Whatever Turns You On), a laugh track was added which was composed almost exclusively of children's laughter, with some peppering of adult laughter. While unique and appropriate for the nature of the show, the use and quality of the laugh track varied from season to season. The 1981 episodes featured an excellent variety of different laughs, offering a more authentic sound. The 1982 season, which was the first season of the series produced for U.S. cable channel Nickelodeon, used fewer laughs, but also employed Carroll Pratt's titter track used on U.S. sitcoms such as Happy Days and What's Happening!!. The last six episodes of 1982 corrected the repetition of the kiddie track by mixing different laughs together, along with the titter track. 1983 took a noticeable downturn, with the laugh track being considerably muted and poorly edited. By 1984, the editors corrected this problem, with laughs reverting to 1982 minus the effective titter track. In 1986, a new children's laugh track was used with decidedly younger sounding laughs to match the material, which targeting a younger demographic than earlier seasons. When the series returned in 1989, it used both 1981 and 1986 kiddie tracks.

China
I Love My Family, the first multi-camera sitcom in mainland China, used a live studio audience. Some single-camera comedies, such as iPartment, used a laugh track.

Laugh tracks are commonly used in variety shows for comic effect. Examples include Super Sunday, Kangxi Lai Le, Variety Big Brother and Home Run.

Latin America
Several Latin American countries like Argentina replace the laugh track with a crew of off-screen people paid specifically to laugh on command whenever the comedic situation merits a laugh. Known as reidores ("laughers"), a senior laugher signals all the others when to laugh. In others like Mexico, comedies without audience reactions were openly stated to have no laugh track because they respected their audience, most notably Chespirito programs like El Chapulín Colorado and  El Chavo del Ocho.

France
Most French television comedies do not incorporate laugh tracks. One noticeable try was on AB Productions television series, produced by Jean-Luc Azoulay, such as Hélène et les Garçons and the following series, each one being a spin-off of the previous one - which allowed using the same stages or actors. Each series copied the use of the sitcom format, such as twenty minutes duration, almost single camera, but no studio audience, since the editing was very poor and very short principal photography (somehow, many in-camera editing episodes could be shot during the same day), which makes actual audience laughter impossible. Many criticisms were made of the poor quality of the realisation, actor play, many of them were not professional actors, and also the attempt to copy American series format – mix-up of sitcom, soap-opera and teen drama – in which laughter was the main complaint.

Effects
In order to gauge the continued relevance of Douglass's laugh track, a study was published in 1974 in the Journal of Personality and Social Psychology that concluded people were still more likely to laugh at jokes that were followed by canned laughter. That Girl co-creator Sam Denoff commented in 1978 that "laughter is social. It's easier to laugh when you're with people." Denoff added "in a movie theatre, you don't need a laugh track, but at home, watching TV, you're probably alone or with just a few others."

Dartmouth College psychology professor Bill Kelley gauged the necessity of the laugh track, particularly on U.S. sitcoms. He stated "we're much more likely to laugh at something funny in the presence of other people." Kelley's research compared students' reactions to an episode of Seinfeld, which utilizes a laugh track, to those watching The Simpsons, which does not. Brain scans suggested that viewers found the same things funny and the same regions of their brain lit up whether or not they heard others laughing. Despite this, Kelley still found value in the laugh track. "When done well," Kelley commented, "they can give people pointers about what's funny and help them along. But when done poorly, you notice a laugh track and it seems unnatural and out of place."

Legacy and support
Since its inception, the idea of prerecorded laughter has had its share of supporters as well as detractors.

Si Rose, executive producer for Sid and Marty Krofft, convinced the Kroffts to use a laugh track on their puppet shows, such as H.R. Pufnstuf, The Bugaloos and Sigmund and the Sea Monsters. Rose stated:
 In 2000, Sid Krofft commented, "We were sort of against that [the laugh track], but Si Rose – being in sitcoms – he felt that when the show was put together that the children would not know when to laugh." Marty Krofft added:
 When discussing the show's production techniques for The Bugaloos DVD commentary track in 2006, British series stars Caroline Ellis and John Philpott addressed the laugh track, which at that time was uncharacteristic and often scorned in the United Kingdom. "I was never one for the American canned laughter, because sometimes it's too much," said Ellis. She added, however, that it does help in creating "the atmosphere for the reaction." Philpott added that, unlike their UK counterparts, US viewing audiences at the time had become accustomed to hearing laughter, saying, "I think you find yourself genuinely laughing more if you are prompted to laugh along with the canned laughter." When viewing the Kroffts' H.R. Pufnstuf for the first time, Brady Bunch star Susan Olsen described the laugh track as "overbearing," saying, "I remember being eight years old...and just thinking, 'Will they get rid of that awful canned laughter?!'" Olsen added that recreational drug use was necessary to enjoy the silliness of the program, saying, "I never tried combining mind-altering substances and Krofft entertainment; I'm afraid the laugh track would send me on a bad trip."

In a 2007 interview, Filmation producer/founder Lou Scheimer praised the laugh track for its usage on The Archie Show. "Why did we use a laugh track?" Scheimer asked. "Because it makes the audience want to laugh with all the other people who are watching [at home]. And you felt like [you were] part of the show than just [being] an observer." Scheimer confirmed that The Archie Show was the first Saturday morning cartoon to utilize a laugh track.

Television and laugh track historian Ben Glenn, II, commented that the laugh tracks currently used are radically different from the "carefree" quality of the laughter of past:

Several months after Douglass's death in 2003, his son Bob commented on the pros and cons of his father's invention:

Carroll Pratt confirmed Douglass's comments in a June 2002 interview with the Archive of American Television, saying that producers regularly wanted louder, longer laughs:

Few re-recording mixers have carried on the "laff box" tradition. In addition to Bob Douglass, Los Angeles-based mixers Bob La Masney, and Sound One's Jack Donato and John Bickelhaupt currently specialize in audience sweetening. While modern digital machines are not as cumbersome as Douglass's original machinery, Bickelhaupt confirmed they "are pretty anonymous, with [unlabeled] knobs and buttons. We like to remain kind of mysterious – the man-behind-the-curtain thing. We don't really like to talk about it too much." Bickelhaupt added that "most of the time, what we're doing isn't re-creating a studio audience; the audience laughter is already there. But in editing, when sections of the show are taken out, when they take out lines to make the show fit a time slot – we have to cover the bridge between one laugh and another by using the laugh machine." In reference to the quiet laugh track employed on How I Met Your Mother, Bickelhaupt commented that producers are increasingly "shying away from that big, full audience – the raucous sound that was more commonplace in the 70s, 80s, and 90s. They want a more subtle track." Bickelhaupt concluded, "I have a great job. When you sit and work on comedy all day, you can't possibly get depressed. When people ask me what I do for a living, I tell them, 'I laugh.'"

Steven Levitan, creator of Just Shoot Me! (a multi-camera series that used live and taped audience reactions) and co-creator of Modern Family (which does not utilize live or recorded audience laughter as a single-camera series), commented, "When used properly, the laugh guy's job is to smooth out the soundtrack – nothing more." Phil Rosenthal confirmed that he "rarely manipulated the laughs" on Everybody Loves Raymond. "I worked on shows in the past where the 'sweetener' was ladled on with a heavy hand, mainly because there were hardly any laughs from the living. The executive producers would say, 'Don't worry – you know who will love that joke? Mr. Sweet man.'" Bickelhaupt confirmed this observation, admitting there are many occasions he has created all audience responses. Conversely, Lloyd J. Schwartz, son of Brady Bunch creator Sherwood Schwartz, admitted in his book, Brady, Brady, Brady, that the laugh track in his directorial debut of The Brady Bunch (S4E23 "Room at the Top") was "significantly louder than any of the other [Brady Bunch] episodes." Schwartz added, "I'm a little embarrassed about it now, but I wanted to make sure that the manufactured audience got all the jokes I directed."

Karal Ann Marling, professor of American studies and art history at the University of Minnesota, voiced concerns about Douglass's invention:

Marling added she was concerned more about canned laughter as a symptom of a larger social willingness to accept things uncritically, which included political messages as well as commercial messages. "It's a kind of decline in American feistiness and an ability to think for yourself," she said. "It certainly is embedded, but that doesn't make it a good thing. There are a lot of things that we do every day of the week that aren't good things. And this is one of them."

See also

 Artificial crowd noise
 Claque
 Noddies
 Studio audience

References

External links
 "Artificially Sweetened: The Story of Canned Laughter" at neatorama.com
 TVParty.com – The Laugh Track
 Newyorktimes.com – Charles Douglass
 Canned Laughter: A History Reconstructed – An Interview with Ben Glenn II, television historian
 Laugh Tracks are No Replacement for the Real Thing
 Charley Douglass Laugh Track Appreciation page

Laughter
Sitcoms
Sketch comedy
Sound recording
Television terminology
Audiovisual introductions in 1950